The pont de Sèvres is a bridge above the Seine that links the cities of Boulogne-Billancourt and Sèvres, in France. The current bridge was put in service in 1963.

The bridge is also above the RD 1 and RD 7 roads, and the Île-de-France tramway Line 2.

Bridges completed in 1963
Bridges over the River Seine
Buildings and structures in Hauts-de-Seine
Transport in Hauts-de-Seine